Tsui Wan Estate is a public housing estate in Chai Wan, Hong Kong Island, Hong Kong, near Chai Wan Park, Yue Wan Estate and Tsui Lok Estate. Built on the reclaimed land in Chai Wan, the estate consists of 4 residential blocks completed in 1988. In 1999, some of the flats were sold to tenants through Tenants Purchase Scheme Phase 2.

Tsui Lok Estate is a public housing estate in Chai Wan, located near Chai Wan Park, Yue Wan Estate and Tsui Wan Estate. Built on the former site of Yue Wan Temporary Housing Area on reclaimed land in Chai Wan, the estate consists of only 1 residential block built in 1999.

Hang Tsui Court is a Home Ownership Scheme court on the reclaimed land in Chai Wan, near Chai Wan Park, Yue Wan Estate, Tsui Wan Estate and Tsui Lok Estate. It has 2 blocks built in 1997.

Houses

Tsui Wan Estate

Tsui Lok Estate

Hang Tsui Court

Hang Tsui Court is in Primary One Admission (POA) School Net 16. Within the school net are multiple aided schools (operated independently but funded with government money) and two government schools: Shau Kei Wan Government Primary School and Aldrich Bay Government Primary School.

Demographics
According to the 2016 by-census, Tsui Wan Estate had a population of 6,446. The median age was 48.1 and the majority of residents (97.2 per cent) were of Chinese ethnicity. The average household size was 2.9 people. The median monthly household income of all households (i.e. including both economically active and inactive households) was HK$25,000.

Politics
Tsui Wan Estate, Tsui Lok Estate and Hang Tsui Court are located in Tsui Wan constituency of the Eastern District Council. It is currently represented by Ku Kwai-yiu, who was elected in the 2019 elections.

Education
Tsui Wan Estate is in Primary One Admission (POA) School Net 16. Within the school net are multiple aided schools (operated independently but funded with government money) and two government schools: Shau Kei Wan Government Primary School and Aldrich Bay Government Primary School.

See also

Public housing estates in Chai Wan and Siu Sai Wan

References

Chai Wan
Public housing estates in Hong Kong
Tenants Purchase Scheme
Residential buildings completed in 1988